The second series of Dancing on Ice aired from 20 January to 17 March 2007 on ITV. It was presented by Phillip Schofield and Holly Willoughby, and judged by the "Ice Panel", consisting of Nicky Slater, Natalia Bestemianova (who replaced Karen Kresge), Jason Gardiner, Karen Barber and Robin Cousins. Jayne Torvill and Christopher Dean coached and trained the contestants. In this series, eleven celebrities competed, compared to ten in the first series. The series was won by former rugby star Kyran Bracken, with Melanie Lambert as the professional winner.

Judges and Hosts 

It was announced that Karen Kresge would leave the show for unknown reasons. Then, it was announced that Karen Barber, Robin Cousins, Nicky Slater and Jason Gardiner would return to the show with Natalia Bestemianova replacing Kresge. Schofield and Willoughby announced their returns with Jayne Torvill and Christopher Dean. Stephen Mulhern returned to host Dancing On Ice: Defrosted.

Couples
The contestants for the second series were:

Scoring chart
Red numbers indicate the lowest score of the week
Green numbers indicate the highest score of the week
 indicates the couple that was in the skate off
 indicates the couple that was eliminated
 indicates that the couple won
 indicates that the couple came in second place
 indicates that the couple came in third place
X indicates the couple who did not skate that week

Average chart
This table only count for dances scored on a traditional 30 points scale.

Live show details

Results summary
Colour key

Week 1 (20 January)

Judges' votes to save
 Slater: Kay & Fred 
 Bestemianova: Kay & Fred
 Gardiner: Foxy & Pam
 Barber: Kay & Fred
 Cousins: Kay & Fred

Week 2 (27 January)
Running order

Judges' votes to save
 Slater: Ulrika & Pavel
 Bestemianova: Ulrika & Pavel
 Gardiner: Ulrika & Pavel
 Barber: Ulrika & Pavel
 Cousins: Ulrika & Pavel

Week 3 (3 February) (Movies Week)

Judges' votes to save
 Slater: Kay & Fred
 Bestemianova: Kay & Fred
 Gardiner: Kay & Fred
 Barber: Ulrika & Pavel
 Cousins: Kay & Fred

Week 4 (10 February)
Running order

Judges' votes to save
 Slater: Lee & Frankie
 Bestemianova: Lee & Frankie
 Gardiner: Lee & Frankie
 Barber: Lee & Frankie
 Cousins: Lee & Frankie

Week 5 (17 February)
Theme: Country Western Night

Judges' votes to save
 Slater: Clare & Andrei
 Bestemianova: Clare & Andrei
 Gardiner: Clare & Andrei
 Barber: Clare & Andrei
 Cousins: Clare & Andrei

Week 6 (24 February) 

Judges' votes to save
 Slater: Duncan & Maria
 Bestemianova: Duncan & Maria
 Gardiner: Lisa & Matt
 Barber: Duncan & Maria
 Cousins: Duncan & Maria

Week 7 – Props Week (3 March) 

Judges' votes to save
 Slater: Clare & Andrei
 Bestemianova: Clare & Andrei
 Gardiner: Clare & Andrei
 Barber: Clare & Andrei
 Cousins: Clare & Andrei

Week 8 (Semi-finals) 

Judges' votes to save
 Slater: Duncan & Maria
 Bestemianova: Duncan & Maria
 Gardiner: Duncan & Maria
 Barber: Duncan & Maria
 Cousins: Duncan & Maria

Week 9 (Final)

Ratings

References

Series 02
2007 British television seasons